Club Esportiu Cardassar is a Spanish football team based in the town of Sant Llorenç des Cardassar, in the autonomous community of the Balearic Islands. Founded in 1924, it plays in Primera Regional Preferente de Mallorca, holding home matches at Es Moleter, with a capacity of 1,000 seats.

Season to season

18 seasons in Tercera División

References

External links
Official website 

Football clubs in the Balearic Islands
Sport in the Balearic Islands
Association football clubs established in 1924
1924 establishments in Spain